Caryocolum provinciella is a moth of the family Gelechiidae. It is found in Greece, France, Spain, Portugal and Morocco.

The length of the forewings is 5–6 mm. The forewings are mid- to dark brown, but the dorsal margin is light brown with scattered white scales. Adults have been recorded on wing from April to May and in August. There are two generations per year.

The larvae probably feed on Silene nicaensis and Herniaria species. They live in sand tubes at the base of the host plant and feed on the young shoots before pupating in sand-cocoons. Larvae can be found from September to March and in June.

References

Moths described in 1869
provinciella
Moths of Europe
Moths of Africa